Gilawala railway station (Urdu and ) is located in Gilawala village, Lodhran district of Punjab province of the Pakistan.

See also
 List of railway stations in Pakistan
 Pakistan Railways

References

External links

Railway stations in Lodhran District
Railway stations on Karachi–Peshawar Line (ML 1)